Lucius Hre Kung (born 4 February 1959) is a Burmese Roman Catholic bishop.

Ordained to the priesthood in 1989, Hre Kung was named bishop of Roman Catholic Diocese of Hakha, Burma on 19 October 2013.

References 

1959 births
Living people
People from Chin State
21st-century Roman Catholic bishops in Myanmar
Place of birth missing (living people)